Pennsylvania Route 845 (PA 845) is a  state highway located in Mercer County, Pennsylvania.  The southern terminus is at US 62 in Stoneboro.  The northern terminus is at PA 358 in Lake Township.

Route description

PA 845 begins at an intersection with US 62 in Sandy Lake Township, heading west on two-lane undivided Walnut Street. The road runs through wooded areas with some homes, heading into the borough of Stoneboro. Here, the route passes several homes, briefly turning north onto Franklin Street before heading west on Linden Street. PA 845 curves northwest onto Linden Road, entering forested areas. The route turns north as it passes to the west of Sandy Lake. PA 845 heads into Lake Township and becomes Stoneboro Lateral Road, running through a mix of farmland and woodland with a few residences. The route reaches its northern terminus at an intersection with PA 358.

Major intersections

See also

References

External links

Pennsylvania Highways: PA 845

845